Zarzycki (feminine: Zarzycka, plural: Zarzyccy) is a Polish surname. Notable people with the surname include:

 Aleksander Zarzycki (1834–1895), Polish pianist, composer and conductor
 Ferdynand Zarzycki (1888–1958), Polish general and politician
 Jerzy Zarzycki (1911–1971), Polish film director
 Wojtek Zarzycki (born 1982), Polish-Canadian retired footballer
 Zbigniew Zarzycki (born 1948), Polish former volleyball player

See also
 

Polish-language surnames